"The Second Coming" is the 84th episode of the HBO television series The Sopranos, the seventh episode of the second half of the show's sixth season, and the 19th episode of the season overall. Written by Terence Winter and directed by Tim Van Patten, it originally aired in the United States on May 20, 2007.

Starring
 James Gandolfini as Tony Soprano
 Lorraine Bracco as Dr. Jennifer Melfi
 Edie Falco as Carmela Soprano
 Michael Imperioli as Christopher Moltisanti**
 Dominic Chianese as Corrado Soprano, Jr.*
 Steven Van Zandt as Silvio Dante
 Tony Sirico as Paulie Gualtieri
 Robert Iler as Anthony Soprano, Jr.
 Jamie-Lynn Sigler as Meadow Soprano
 Aida Turturro as Janice Soprano Baccalieri*
 Steven R. Schirripa as Bobby Baccalieri
 Frank Vincent as Phil Leotardo
 Ray Abruzzo as Little Carmine Lupertazzi
 Dan Grimaldi as Patsy Parisi
 Arthur Nascarella as Carlo Gervasi
* = credit only
** = photo only

Guest starring

Synopsis
Tony goes with Silvio and Bobby to a sitdown with Phil in New York. He offers a compromise about the asbestos removal, but Phil rejects it out of hand. In response, Tony takes Phil's men Coco and Butchie off the payroll from another construction project. When they hear of this from the foreman, they viciously beat him up and steal the cash in his wallet.

A drunken Coco notices Meadow in a restaurant. He touches her cheek and makes some lewd comments. She reluctantly tells her father. Enraged, Tony finds Coco and pistol-whips and curb stomps him. This assault opens a deep rift between the Soprano and Lupertazzi families. Little Carmine tells Tony that he will once again broker a truce meeting with Phil, who has shut down one of their joint construction projects. Tony admits, "I lost it, bad timing." But Phil refuses to meet with them when they arrive at his home; from behind a second-floor window, he spews profanities as they walk away.

FBI Agents Harris and Goddard visit Satriale's and ask Tony to look at some photos. Tony identifies Ahmed and Muhammad.

When Dr. Melfi sees Dr. Kupferberg, he shares with her the results of a recent study which has shown that sociopaths are not helped by talk therapy but rather only further enabled by it, perhaps even "sharpening their skills as con men" in the process.

Meadow reveals that her new boyfriend is Patrick Parisi, Patsy's eldest son, and that, inspired by him, she has decided to enter law school.

A.J. remains depressed. Moved by W. B. Yeats' apocalyptic poem “The Second Coming”, he tries to kill himself in the family pool. With one foot tied by a rope to a cinder block, and with a plastic bag over his head, he jumps in. But the rope is too long to keep him submerged. He struggles: he can neither drown nor save himself. Tony happens to come home. Hearing shouts, he goes out. He runs and jumps, wearing a suit and tie, into the pool. He saves A.J. and hauls up the cinder block. At first, he is shocked and furious, but A.J. is sobbing; he cradles his son in his lap, saying "Come on, baby, you're all right, baby."

A.J. is put on Valium and admitted to a psychiatric ward. At a session with his therapist and his parents, he speaks of resentments going back to 2nd grade, and quotes his grandmother at the end of her life: "It's all a big nothing." This session occurs just after Tony's assault on Coco; as he listens, he notices one of Coco's bloody teeth in the cuff of his pant leg. Tony and Carmela both feel guilty about the attempted suicide, and each blames the other.

Tony scornfully rejects Dr. Melfi's suggestion that A.J. was calling for help and, at some level, knew the rope was too long. "He could just be a fucking idiot. Historically, that's been the case." He tells her about his insight on peyote: "I saw … that this and everything we experience is not all there is – there's something else."

Final appearances
 Kelli Lombardo Moltisanti: widow of Christopher Moltisanti

Production
 Arthur J. Nascarella (Carlo Gervasi) is promoted to the main cast and billed in the opening credits but only for this episode.

References to prior episodes
 During their fight, Carmela angrily mentions the incident when Tony's father shot his mother through her beehive hairdo, as told to her by Janice in "Soprano Home Movies"; Tony hates the anecdote because it makes the Soprano family look "dysfunctional." The scene where Johnny Soprano shoots Livia’s hairdo was later depicted onscreen in the 2021 film The Many Saints of Newark.
 A.J. recalls being deeply affected by Livia's comments that life is a "big nothing" and, "in the end . . . you die in your own arms" when he visited her in the Season 2 episode "D-Girl". A.J. also recalls Carmela calling him an "animal" for smoking marijuana at his confirmation, which occurred in the same episode. It is notable that in the season finale of Season 2, Tony, after waking up from the dream that he burns himself alive, says "It's all a big nothing... Life." to Carmela.
 Tony appeals to Phil to negotiate and work together, in front of all the mobsters referring to the peace-making conversation they had in the hospital after Phil had suffered a heart attack, which happened in "Kaisha."
 Dr. Melfi had previously quoted from Yeats' "The Second Coming" in "Cold Cuts", reciting two lines of the poem not heard in this episode: "The centre cannot hold" and "The falcon cannot hear the falconer".

Other cultural and historical references
 Tony gives Carmela an engraved Baume et Mercier watch, as a present from his trip to Vegas.
 When Agent Harris asks Tony to look at some photos, Tony jokingly asks him if any of them are of Angelina Jolie.
 Dr. Vogel mentions the Israeli–Palestinian conflict. A.J. says he watches CNN and is later seen reading the Al Jazeera website; he also mentions Indonesian mujahideen.
 Meadow mentions to A.J. how funny Borat is.
 As one reason to explain his constant interest in Dr. Melfi's mobster patient, Dr. Kupferberg says his father was a big Untouchables fan.
 After A.J. makes disparaging remarks about the cattle industry during a family dinner, Tony exclaims, "Twenty years he won't crack a book; all of a sudden he's the world's foremost authority!"—possibly an ironic reference to the comedian Professor Irwin Corey.
 The psychiatric study Dr. Kupferberg refers to is The Criminal Personality by Drs. Stanton Samenow and Samuel Yochelson. Although a real study, it was first published in 1977, 30 years before this episode takes place.
 Describing his peyote trip, Tony refers to "Roger Corman shit". Roger Corman directed the film The Trip (1967).
 When Carmela visits AJ at the psychiatric ward, the TV show Friends is playing in the background.

Music
The song "Ridin'", by Chamillionaire, is played by A.J. when he wakes up in the morning at the beginning of the episode.
The song "Please Mr. Postman", by The Marvelettes, is playing when Tony, Silvio, Paulie, Carlo, Walden, and Bobby discuss Tony's trip to Vegas and their respective drug experiences. 
The song "Suspicious Minds", by Elvis Presley, is playing in the back room of Satriale's while Tony meets with Patsy and (later) Little Carmine.
The song "Into the Ocean", by Blue October, is playing during A.J. and Meadow's conversation in his room.
The song "Caravan", by The Brian Setzer Orchestra, plays when Tony beats and curb-stomps Coco following Coco's comments to Meadow.
The song "Ninna Ninna – Lullaby", that plays over the closing credits, is a traditional Sardinian song from the Smithsonian Folkways album Italian Folk Songs and Dances (1955). Its original, traditional title was "Sa corsicana".
The song "I Wanna Be Your Lover", by Prince, is playing when Tony discusses A.J.'s suicide attempt at Bada Bing.

Awards
 This episode was nominated for and won Outstanding Writing for a Drama Series at the WGA Awards.

References

External links
"The Second Coming"  at HBO

The Sopranos (season 6) episodes
2007 American television episodes
Television episodes directed by Tim Van Patten
Television episodes written by Terence Winter